Major-General Sir Horace Eckford Roome  (17 May 1887 -  29 June 1964) was an officer of the Royal Engineers.

He was commissioned into the Royal Engineers from the Royal Military Academy, Woolwich on 18 December 1907.

During the First World War he was awarded the Military Cross in 1916 for 'distinguished service in the field in Mesopotamia' and was Mentioned in Despatches.

During World War II he was appointed Brigadier and Chief Engineer India from 1 August 1939 to 20 November 1941.

He was promoted acting Major-General 21 November 1941, temporary Major-General 21 November 1942, and finally substantive Major-General 8 May 1944 (with seniority 25 September 1941).

He was Engineer-in-Chief, General Headquarters, India in 1945.

He was awarded CBE in 1941 and the CB in 1944. He was knighted KCIE in 1946.

He retired on 8 January 1947.

His son was Major-General Oliver Roome, R.E.

References 

1887 births
1964 deaths
Knights Commander of the Order of the Indian Empire
Companions of the Order of the Bath
Commanders of the Order of the British Empire
Recipients of the Military Cross
Deputy Lieutenants of Hampshire
British Army generals of World War II
British Army personnel of World War I
Graduates of the Royal Military Academy, Woolwich
Royal Engineers officers